The following lists events that happened during 1969 in Chile.

Incumbents
President of Chile: Eduardo Frei Montalva

Events

February
1 February - The broadcasts of the local Televisión Nacional de Chile station begin in Punta Arenas.

March
2 March – Chilean parliamentary election, 1969
9g March - Puerto Montt Massacre
25 March - The La Silla Observatory is inaugurated in the current Coquimbo Region.

April
28 April - Crash of LAN Chile Flight 160.  A Boeing 727 from Buenos Aires crashed in a field near Colina.  There were no deaths or injuries.

May
21 May - The transmissions of the third station of National Television of Chile begin, this time in the city of Talca.
26 May - Chile signs the Andean Pact.
29 May - Construction begins on Line 1 of the Santiago Metro, that would unite the Civic District of Santiago with the Barrancas sector.

June
15 June - The Huanchaca street scandal occurs, when 9 young homosexuals were detained in a house located at number 352 of said street in the city of Antofagasta and arrested until 2 July, in which they suffered mistreatment and abuse.

August
A binational commission sets the maritime limits between Chile and Peru through two lighthouses on each side of the border.

September
18 September - Official broadcasts of Chile's National Television begin in Santiago.

October
21 October – Tacnazo insurrection

November
12 November - Flight 87 of LAN Chile was hijacked, considered the first air piracy attack in national history
22 November - The Radical Democracy political party was founded.

December
3 December - An Air France Boeing 707 exploded in midair and fell into the sea two minutes after taking off at 7:03 p.m. from Maiquetía bound for Lisbon and Paris.  62 people died.  The plane had arrived in Venezuela from Santiago de Chile and the flight was 24 hours late due to strikes in France.

Births
7 January – Raimundo Tupper (d. 1995)
28 January – Fernando Cornejo (d. 2009)
15 March – Juan Cristóbal Guarello
10 May – Javier Margas
22 June – Ronald Fuentes
4 July – Alejandra Fosalba
14 July – Carlo de Gavardo (d. 2015)
27 August – Karen Doggenweiler
18 September – Rafael Araneda
15 October – Roberto Artiagoitia
6 December – Rodrigo Vásquez Schroder
24 December – Luis Musrri
27 December  – Miguel Cerda

Deaths
9 February – Manuel Plaza (b. 1900)

References 

 
Years of the 20th century in Chile
Chile